Aceste bellidifera is a species of sea urchin of the family Schizasteridae. Their armour is covered with spines.  Aceste bellidifera was first scientifically described in 1877 by Thomson.

References 

Spatangoida
Animals described in 1877